Clarendon Vale is a rural residential locality in the local government area (LGA) of Clarence in the Hobart LGA region of Tasmania. The 2016 census recorded a population of 1267 for the state suburb of Clarendon Vale.
It is a suburb of Hobart.

History 
Clarendon Vale was gazetted as a locality in 1977.

Like nearby Rokeby, it was originally a public housing area in the 1970s; however, like the trend in many public housing areas in Hobart, much of the public housing stock has been sold to private owners.

Geography
Clarence Plains Rivulet forms the south-western boundary.

Road infrastructure 
Route B33 (Rokeby Road / South Arm Road) passes to the south-west. From there, Mockridge Road provides access to the locality.

References

Localities of City of Clarence